Richard Vincent Allen (born January 1, 1936) was the United States National Security Advisor to President Ronald Reagan from 1981 to 1982, having been Reagan's chief foreign policy advisor from 1977. He has been a fellow of the Hoover Institution since 1983. He is a past member of the Defense Policy Board Advisory Committee.

Background
Allen was born in 1936 in Collingswood, New Jersey. A graduate of Saint Francis Preparatory School in Spring Grove, Pennsylvania, Allen received his BA and MA degrees from the University of Notre Dame. His MA from Notre Dame is in political science.

Career
Allen worked at the Center for Strategic and International Studies from 1962 to 1966. He was then a senior staff member of the Hoover Institution from 1966 to 1968, leaving to become foreign policy coordinator to Richard Nixon, and serving twice in the Nixon White House. He was then Ronald Reagan's chief foreign policy advisor from 1977 to 1980, before being appointed as Reagan's first National Security Advisor.

Allen wrote a New York Times article in 2000 detailing his role in the recruitment of George H. W. Bush to be Reagan's vice president.

National Security Advisor (1981–82)
In November 1981, while serving as Reagan's National Security Advisor, Allen was accused of receiving a bribe from a Japanese journalist for setting up an interview in January 1981 with First Lady Nancy Reagan. Ronald Reagan said, in his diary, that the Japanese magazine gave cash gifts to people that it interviewed, and that Allen had stepped in to intercept the check to avoid embarrassment for Nancy Reagan, then gave the check to his secretary, who put it in an office safe. Then when Allen changed offices, the check was found left in the safe. The FBI cleared everyone involved, then the Justice Department began its own investigation, and the story got leaked to the press. Reagan believed it was just political sabotage behind leaking the story. A classified US government source later revealed that Allen and his Potomac Associates partners were caught soliciting bribes/"consulting fees" from Japanese corporations. Japanese security operations reported the crime to the US Embassy in Tokyo and requested the US government quietly handle the removal. Although the claims were never proven, Allen was eventually pressed into taking a leave of absence, his position being filled by his deputy, James W. Nance, and ultimately resigning his position on January 4, 1982.

Also in 1981 Richard Allen said that an unidentified third country (possibly Canada) had passed on an offer of 50 Vietnam War POWs in return for $4 billion.  In lengthy, closed-door testimony under oath to committee investigators on June 23, 1992, he generally confirmed Hanoi's 1981 offer. Allen was asked by a committee staffer, "Soon after taking office, did the Reagan administration become involved in an offer made by the Vietnamese government for the return of live prisoners of war, if you can recall?"

He responded, "This $4 billion figure sticks in my mind, and I remember writing something—I don't know whether it was during a meeting with the president or to him—saying that it would be worth the president's going along and let's have the negotiation…"

Then Allen was asked, "Do you recall whether the $4 billion was for live American prisoners? To which he replied, "Yes, I do if it was $4 billion, it was indeed for live prisoners." When asked how many POWs he believed were still being held, he replied, "Dozens, hundreds."
He later recanted and no other official has supported the statement in public.

Later career
He is currently a senior fellow at Stanford University's Hoover Institution, and a member of The Heritage Foundation's Asian Studies Center Advisory Council, the Council on Foreign Relations, the United States Defense Policy Board, the American Alternative Foundation, and the United States National Security Advisory Group. He also serves on the advisory council of the Nixon Center.

Allen is president of the Richard V. Allen Company, a Washington-based consulting services firm.  He provides consulting services to international companies and organizations. He currently serves on APCO Worldwide's Iraq reconstruction task force and is considered one of the most influential lobbyists in Washington for South Korean interests.

Richard Allen is also a fellow of St Margaret's College, Otago, one of New Zealand's most prestigious residential colleges.

Books
 Allen, Richard V. (1966). Peace and Peaceful Coexistence. Chicago: American Bar Association, 1966.
 Allen, Richard V. (1967). Communism and Democracy: Theory and Action. Princeton: Van Nostrand, 1967.
 Allen, Richard V. (1969). Yearbook On International Communist Affairs 1968. Hoover Institution Press. .

Filmography
 Die Hard with a Vengeance (1995)—Chief Allen
 Killing Reagan, 2016

References

External links
 Statement of Richard Allen before the Subcommittee on Terrorism and Homeland Security of the House Permanent Select Committee on Intelligence, October 11, 2001.
 Letter to President Bush on the War on Terrorism, signed by Richard V. Allen, September 20, 2001.
 
 Interview with Miller Center of Public Affairs – Presidential Oral History Program
 Richard Allen

|-

1936 births
California Republicans
Living people
New Jersey Republicans
People from Collingswood, New Jersey
Reagan administration personnel
The Heritage Foundation
United States National Security Advisors
United States presidential advisors
Notre Dame College of Arts and Letters alumni
United States Deputy National Security Advisors